Dorian Jose Holley is an American musician, backing singer and a vocal coach. He began his professional career as an on-stage backing vocalist for American entertainer Michael Jackson during his Bad World Tour in 1987. He staged a series of live concerts in front of audiences around the world, including the British royalty. From there, Holley went on to travel with Jackson for all of his subsequent world tours. He also performed with other artists such as Rod Stewart in 1991 and James Taylor in 1994 and since 2019. In 1991, Holley was the singing voice of Choir Boy in the Robert Townsend movie, The Five Heartbeats. His stage presence and vocal ability were praised by music critics during such performances.

Holley auditioned prominently to become a featured vocalist on the reality television show Dancing with the Stars. He served in this capacity for the first three seasons of the American series. Holley has also worked for several years as an associate music director and vocal coach for the singing competition American Idol. He worked there with the contestants before and after they appear before the show's judges and the worldwide television audience.

In 2008, Holley released his debut album, Independent Film. Next year he worked with Jackson for the last time, in preparation for the entertainer's ill-fated concert series This Is It. Holley was to serve as a backing vocalist, as well as the vocal director for the shows. Jackson's death forced the concerts to be canceled.

In 2010, Holley host a weekend at the LA Music Academy called "The Art of the Audition". As of 2011, he was the vocalist for the house band on The Tonight Show with Jay Leno led by Rickey Minor. He is also the Artist Development Director at Los Angeles Music Academy College of Music and teaches in the school's vocal department. Dorian is married to trial attorney Shawn Holley, who once represented Jackson and has been a chief legal correspondent for the E! network.

Career

Bad World Tour
Holley first performed with pop superstar Michael Jackson during the entertainer's first solo concert series, the Bad World Tour. Beginning in Japan in September 1987, the tour lasted for 16 months, during which time he visited 15 countries while serving as a backing singer for Jackson, along with Kevin Dorsey, Darryl Phinnessee and Sheryl Crow. As part of the tour, he performed to over 4 million people, including Diana, Princess of Wales and Charles, Prince of Wales. The Bad World Tour concluded several months later in January 1989.

English musician Rod Stewart enlisted the services of both Holley and Phinnessee in 1991, when he toured the US. The two singers were part of an 11-man backing ensemble, when Stewart performed at the Pacific Amphitheatre in Costa Mesa, Orange County, and in California in September 1991. During the show's encore, Stewart performed his signature song "Twistin' the Night Away". The Los Angeles Times described in a review of the concert that the song was "embellished with a delicious a cappella doo-wop break featuring the 46-year-old star and backup singers Darryl Phinnessee and Dorian Holley". The two vocalists were also praised by the Chicago Tribune after a performance at the Poplar Creek Music Theatre, where their "sublime harmonies" "formed a perfect counterpoint to Stewart's impassioned pleas on 'This Old Heart of Mine'". The San Jose Mercury News concluded that Holley and Phinnessee were "great".

Dangerous Tour and HIStory Tour
Holley returned to work with Jackson for the Dangerous World Tour (June 1992–November 1993), a 69 date concert series which was attended by almost 3.5 million fans. The tour was cut short after child sexual abuse allegations were leveled against Jackson. He canceled the remainder of the tour due to the stress caused by the accusations.

In 1994, he joined with Kate Markowitz, Valerie Carter, and David Lasley to form what The Pantagraph and The Boston Globe respectively described as a "wonderful" and "angelic" backing group to James Taylor. While on tour with Taylor, he was praised for his vocal ability by several news sources. The Roanoke Times stated that the highlight of the show at the Roanoke Civic Center was the performance of "Shower the People", which "showcased the singing" of Holley. The St. Louis Post-Dispatch revealed during a performance of the same song at Riverport Amphitheater that the backing vocalist "sang a spirited solo that drew an ovation equal to anything Taylor had drawn thus far". He returned in 2019 when Arnold McCuller was busy touring with Phil Collins.

Holley worked with Michael Jackson again for the entertainer's last concert series, the HIStory World Tour, which began in Prague, Czech in September 1996. The tour attracted more than 4.5 million fans from 58 cities in 35 countries around the world and concluded in Durban, South Africa in October 1997.

Reality television work
Holley auditioned to become a featured vocalist on the American reality television show Dancing with the Stars. The audition was performed in seven different sounds, ranging from Frank Sinatra to Sly Stone. He was a successful and became a featured singer during the first three seasons of the series. Holley later noted that the concept of diversity in vocal performance was not a new experience for him. "I've been at sessions where a producer has said he wants me to sound like Michael Jackson and Bruce Springsteen at the same time. I've had people say can you make it a little more green. Huh? It's tricky." He added, "Sometimes they think they want Sheryl Crow, because she has a hit single. But what they really want is magic, and that is whatever you, as an individual, can bring. It's a tough call between being a blank slate and being yourself."

He has also served for several years as an associate music director and vocal coach for the reality singing competition American Idol. As part of his job, he helps contestants rehearse and arrange the songs they are to perform. He states that his primary task, however, is to encourage and support the participants as they face scrutiny and criticism. Holley added that it is common for some of the contestants to "crumble" upon leaving the stage if they have received critical comments from judge Simon Cowell. His job on American Idol has had him work with winners such as Jordin Sparks and Kris Allen.

Debut album
Independent Film, a self-released solo album by Holley, was released in 2008. Joan Anderman of The Boston Globe described the album as being a "soul-satisfying project that won't pay the bills". It was reported in October 2008 that Holley had been conducting workshops on the art of audition. He drew inspiration from his time on American Idol, as well as his experience with artists such as Stevie Wonder, Christina Aguilera, Kanye West and Queen Latifah. While at Berklee College of Music, he offered advice to young singers who wanted to become famous. "Everyone starts out dreaming, and then you get married, have a baby, buy a house and a car, and what I want to let people know is that there are so many jobs out there. My thinking is, if you're a musician and you can make music instead of digging a ditch, make it."

Holley's last experiences with Jackson were in 2009, when he prepared for a scheduled 50-date concert series called This Is It. Holley rehearsed with Jackson as a backing singer at the Staples Center in Los Angeles and was also hired as the vocal director for the ill-fated shows. He was present on the singer's last night of rehearsals in June 2009. Hours later, Jackson died after he entered into cardiac arrest at his nearby home. Holley sang during the group rendition of We Are the World at the entertainer's memorial service the subsequent month. He was joined by fellow This Is It backing vocalists Darryl Phinnessee, Judith Hill and Orianthi.

In 2017, he attended Kingvention, a Michael Jackson convention in London where he spoke about Michael Jackson in a live interview with Pez Jax and also performed on stage in front of over 300 Michael Jackson Fans.

Personal life
Holley is married to an American defense attorney Shawn Holley, who practices the law in both civil and criminal proceedings. They have three daughters Nayanna, Sasha Imogen, and Olivia Rose. Nayanna Holley is a singer, actress, and songwriter. She started traveling with her father since she was 3. The Los Angeles Times reported in 2005 that the family lived in a  home, which was built in 1920 and bought by Holley and his wife in 2003. The Standard newspaper noted in 2007 that the couple had purchased a  Italian Renaissance Revival home in Lafayette Square, Los Angeles. Writers for the publication further commented that the Holley planned to keep a home in nearby Wellington Square.

Discography
Independent Film (2008)

Filmography

References
Footnotes

Bibliography

External links
Official website

Living people
American Idol participants
The Tonight Show Band members
1956 births